List of ambassadors of Sweden may refer to:
List of ambassadors of Sweden to China
List of ambassadors of Sweden to Germany
List of ambassadors of Sweden to North Korea
List of ambassadors of Sweden to Saudi Arabia
List of ambassadors of Sweden to Ukraine
List of ambassadors of Sweden to the United Kingdom
Permanent Representative of Sweden to the United Nations
List of ambassadors of Sweden to the United States

Lists of ambassadors by country of origin